Padmalatha is an Indian playback singer who was born in Chennai, India. She rose to her fame after the song "Kannale Kannale" from the movie Thani Oruvan topped the charts when the album released. She is best known for songs like "Kaadhale Kaadhale" and "Kannale Kannale" in Tamil. Her Telugu songs include "Pareshanuraaa", "Choosa Choosa", "Chali Gaali Chuudduu" and "Ghandhaari yaaro".

Discography

Notable Works
Kutti Puli - Aruvaakaaran

Naiyaandi - Inikka Inikka

Indru Netru Naalai - Kadhale Kadhale

Thani Oruvan - Kannala Kannala 

Oru Naal Koothu - Adiye Azhagae

Motta Shiva Ketta Shiva - Hara Hara Mahadevaki & Hara Hara Mahadevaki

Thadam - Inayae

Other works

References

Singers from Chennai
Indian women playback singers
Living people
Tamil playback singers
Telugu playback singers
Year of birth missing (living people)
Women musicians from Tamil Nadu
21st-century Indian singers
21st-century Indian women singers